Volk is the seventh studio album by Slovenian industrial group Laibach, released in 2006. The word "volk" means "people" or "nation" in German and "wolf" in Slovene. The album is a collection of thirteen songs inspired by national or pan-national anthems, plus the anthem of the NSK State, a virtual state to which Laibach belong. The album is a collaboration with another Slovenian band, Silence.

The anthem of the NSK is essentially the same arrangement as "The Great Seal", a song on their 1987 album Opus Dei. Like "The Great Seal", the words are based on Winston Churchill's "We shall fight on the beaches" speech.

Track listing
 "Germania" – based on "Das Lied der Deutschen" (Germany)
 "America" – based on "The Star-Spangled Banner" (United States)
 "Anglia" – based on "God Save the Queen" (United Kingdom)
 "Rossiya" – based on the State Anthem of the Soviet Union, post-2000 "National Anthem of Russia" (Russia), and "The Internationale"
 "Francia" – based on "La Marseillaise" (France)
 "Italia" – based on "Il Canto degli Italiani" (Italy)
 "España" – based on "Marcha Real" (music) and "El Himno de Riego" (lyrics) (Spain)
 "Yisra’el" – based on "Hatikvah" (Israel) and "Fida'i" (Palestine)
 "Türkiye" – based on "İstiklâl Marşı" (Turkey)
 "Zhonghuá" – based on "March of the Volunteers" (People's Republic of China)
 "Nippon" – based on "Kimi ga Yo" (Japan)
 "Slovania" – based on "Hey, Slavs" (anthem of the former Socialist Federal Republic of Yugoslavia and unofficial anthem of Pan-Slavism)
 "Vaticanae" – based on "Inno e Marcia Pontificale" (Vatican City)
 "NSK" – the anthem of Neue Slowenische Kunst, also known as "The Great Seal"

Personnel
Album written and produced by Laibach and Silence, 2005–2006.
 Laibach are:
 Eber
 Saliger
 Dachauer
 Keller
 Silence are:
 Boris Benko
 Primož Hladnik
 Additional musicians:
 Boris Benko (Silence): vocals on all tracks except 08, 09, 10 and 14
 Yolanda Grant-Thompson: vocals on tracks 02 and 13
 Mina Špiler (Melodrom): vocals on tracks 05 and 07
 Maria Awa: vocals on track 07
 Artie Fishel: vocals on track 08
 Zed Mehmet: vocals on track 09
 Elvira Hasanagić: vocals on track 09
 Seaming To: vocals on track 10
 Nagisa Moritoki: vocals on track 11
 Brina Vogelnik Saje: vocals on track 12
 Luka Jamnik: analogue synthesizer sounds on tracks 02, 04 and 05
 Miha Dovžan: zither on track 06
 Peter Dekleva: acoustic guitar on track 04
 Anne Carruthers: cello on tracks 04 and 11
 Alojz Zupan: conductor of brass orchestra on track 14:
 Delavska Godba Trbovlje
 Vitalij Osmačko: conductor of children's choir on track 04:
 Janja Cerar
 Dasha Khotuleva
 Anna Vidovich
 Nastja Yatsko
 Technical support:
 Gregor Zemljič
 Iztok Turk
 Uroš Umek
 Mixing and mastering:
 Paul PDub Walton
 James Aparcio
 Tom Meyer
 Project manager (Mute Records):
 Robert Schilling
 Cover painting:
 Laibach
 Design and layout:
 Phant & Puntza
 Text editing:
 Schrankmeister
 Special thanks to:
 Daniel Miller
 Robert Schilling
 Label: Mute Records

References

2006 albums
Covers albums
Laibach (band) albums
Silence (band) albums
Mute Records albums
Albums recorded in Slovenia
Industrial albums by Slovenian artists